Freedom was a short lived subsidiary label of Liberty Records based in Hollywood, California.

History
Liberty launched its first subsidiary, Freedom Records, during the summer of 1958 and Jerry Capehart was hired as A&R man. One of the first artists to be signed was Johnny Burnette. Eddie Cochran provided lead guitar on some of the singles that came out in 1958/59. Freedom closed down in the summer of 1959.

References

External links
 Freedom discography on Rockin Country Style
 Complete Freedom discography on rockinrecords mailing list
 Freedom discography on Global Dog Productions

American record labels
Record labels established in 1958
Record labels disestablished in 1959
1958 establishments in California